Rustaveli is a station of the Tbilisi Metro on the Akhmeteli–Varketili Line (First Line). It is located at Rustaveli square at the northern end of Rustaveli Avenue next to the Shota Rustaveli statue. The station was opened on 11 January 1966 as part of the original metro line with six stations from Didube to Rustaveli. The construction was carried out according to the project by  O. Kalandarishvili and L. Janelidze.

Located between Tavisuplebis Moedani station and Marjanishvili station, Rustaveli is 60 metres underground (and an escalator length of 120 meters) making the station the deepest of the Tbilisi metro system.  Some sources estimate the depth to be 100 metres. According to some sources, Rustaveli metro station has the world's 8th longest escalator with the length of 120 metres.

The metro station is named after Shota Rustaveli, a great Georgian poet and thinker of the 12th century, the author of The Knight in the Panther's Skin, a Georgian national epic poem. The walls and columns of the station are covered with red marble. The metro station is decorated with relief images and depictions of the theme of Shota Rustaveli's epic poem. A frieze on the theme of Shota Rustaveli and The Knight in the Panther's Skin is placed above the entrance of the metro station, the sculptor of which is Elguja Amashukeli.

Third Line (Rustaveli-Vazisubani Line)
According to the plan of the third line of the Tbilisi Metro, Rustaveli station was supposed to become a transfer station, tentatively referred to as the Rustaveli-2 station, the connecting staircase and passage of which exist in the current station. According to the plan, the Rustaveli-2 station of the third line of the Tbilisi Metro would connect the stations in the western direction to Vake and Didi Dighomi, and in the eastern direction to Saarbrücken Square towards Vazisubani and other south-eastern districts of Tbilisi. The first section of the third metro line was supposed to be built from Rustaveli in the direction of Vazisubani (with stations Rustaveli-2, Saarbrücken Square, Kvemo Elia, Zemo Elia (Metromsheni) and Vazisubani). Nowadays, construction works are frozen.

Gallery

See also
 List of Tbilisi metro stations

References

External links
 Rustaveli metro station page at Tbilisi Municipal Portal (Archived)

Tbilisi Metro stations
Railway stations opened in 1966
1966 establishments in Georgia (country)